L200 or L-200 may refer to:

 Mitsubishi Triton (L200), a compact pickup truck
 Saturn L-Series L200, an automobile by General Motors
 Daihatsu Mira, third generation, an automobile
 Let L-200 Morava, a two-engine touring and light passenger aircraft
 Baryancistrus demantoides, a species of catfish 
 Hemiancistrus subviridis, a species of catfish
 Bumar Fadroma L200 polish wheel loader
 L200 (foam), a type of EVA foam used in special effects makeup, floor mats, etc.